Parliamentary elections were held in Nauru on 6 December 1986. As there were no political parties, all candidates ran as independents. However, the Parliament elected had two opposing groups holding nine seats each, resulting in a deadlock. To resolve the issue, Parliament was dissolved on 30 December, prompting fresh elections in January.

The elections saw the first-ever female candidate elected, with Ruby Dediya becoming MP for Anetan/Ewa and subsequently being appointed Minister for Finance. She retained the position after the 1987 elections.

Results

References

Nauru
1986 in Nauru
Elections in Nauru
Non-partisan elections
Election and referendum articles with incomplete results